Willem Leushuis (Eindhoven, 18 March 1952) is a Dutch football coach and former professional footballer.

Career

Footballer 
Willem Leushuis played for FC Wageningen, FC Den Bosch, and FC Eindhoven in the Netherlands and for AS Verbroedering Geel, FC Beringen, and FC Diest in Belgium.

Football coach 
Leushuis then became coach at Willem II (1992–1995), as the assistant of Jan Reker and coach of the second team. Thereafter he coached for Helmond Sport (1995–1997), next taking on the first squad of FC Eindhoven (1997–2000). Leushuis then took on coaching in the United Arab Emirates (UAE) and Kuwait and as game analyst for the Scottish Football Association.

In 2003 Leushuis returned to the Netherlands, where he coached Kozakken Boys (2003–2005) and IJsselmeervogels (2005–2006). He coached again in the Middle East in 2006–2007. Back in the Netherlands he coached HSV Hoek (2007–08), ASWH (2008–2010), FC Breukelen (2011-2013), and AFC (2013–2014).

At the age of 62, Leushuis left in January 2015 to Kuwait, where he became technical director of the Kuwait Football Association and coach of the Olympic Team. This team had beat Oman, Qatar and the UAE, then lost the finals against Saudi Arabia. Back in Holland Leushuis becomes interim coach of DVS33 Ermelo. vv IJsselmeervogels  asked the chosen best coach of the century back in 2017. OJC Rosmalen signed up with Willem Leushuis in  2018 and the coach is still working with one of the biggest clubs in the Netherlands.

As a coach Leushuis won national championships with IJsselmeervogels, AFC and Kuwait Club, the Amateur Supercup with IJsselmeervogels and the national cup with Qadsia SC. In 2007, he was chosen the best coach of the last 40 years at IJsselmeervogels and best coach of the Topklasse. With OJC Rosmalen Leushuis got the championship in the post-competition to the Third league in 2022.

Family
The brother of Willem Leushuis, Hans Leushuis, is also a former professional footballer. Hans played for Willem II and VVV-Venlo.

References

1952 births
Living people
Dutch footballers
Dutch football managers
ASWH managers
Footballers from Eindhoven
Association footballers not categorized by position
Kozakken Boys managers
Willem II (football club) non-playing staff